Kuharić is a surname in some South Slavic languages derived from the occupation of kuchař, i.e., "cook". Its variants include Kuharic and Kuharich (phonetical). It may refer to:

Franjo Kuharić (1919-2002), cardinal of the Roman Catholic Church
Bill Kuharich, American professional football executive
Joe Kuharich (1917-1981), American football player and coach
Lary Kuharich (1945-2016), American football coach

Slavic-language surnames